The Ministry of Education (Kyoyukpu) is a cabinet-level division of the government of South Korea. It was created on March 23, 2013. It should not be confused with seventeen regional Offices of Education whose heads, Superintendents, are directly elected in local elections.

Its headquarters are in the Sejong Regional Government Complex in Sejong City. Previously it was located in the Central Government Complex in Jongno District, Seoul.

References

External links

 Ministry of Education
 Ministry of Education 

Education
Education in South Korea
Educational organizations based in South Korea
South Korea
South Korea, Education